The Thin Yellow Line is a 2015 Mexican road comedy-drama film directed by Celso R. García. It was one of fourteen films shortlisted by Mexico to be their submission for the Academy Award for Best Foreign Language Film at the 88th Academy Awards, but it lost out to 600 Miles.

Cast
 Damián Alcázar as Toño
 Joaquín Cosio as Gabriel
 Silverio Palacios as Atayde
 Gustavo Sánchez Parra as Mario
 Américo Hollander as Pablo
 Fernando Becerril as Ingeniero

Reception
On review aggregator website Rotten Tomatoes, the film holds an approval rating of 89%, based on 9 reviews, and an average rating of 7/10.

References

External links
 

2015 films
2015 comedy-drama films
Mexican comedy-drama films
2010s Spanish-language films
2010s Mexican films

2010s road comedy-drama films